Joel King Goldsmith (November 19, 1957 – April 29, 2012) was an American composer of film, television, and video game music.

Biography 
Joel Goldsmith was born on November 19, 1957, in Los Angeles, California, the third of four children of Sharon (née Hennagin), a singer, and renowned composer Jerry Goldsmith. He was of Jewish descent. Goldsmith's maternal uncle was composer and professor Michael Hennagin.

He was the main composer for the TV series Stargate SG-1, although the main titles were written by David Arnold (who composed the score to Stargate, the film that began the Stargate franchise). For Stargate Atlantis, Goldsmith composed the main titles and the score. He also composed the main title theme and score for the second season of the CBS series Martial Law.

During his career, he usually collaborated with two composers; his father Jerry Goldsmith, and Neal Acree. He made his first move into video games music in 2006, scoring Call of Duty 3. During his final years, Goldsmith relocated to Hidden Hills, California, where he built a home studio in his back yard.

Goldsmith died of cancer on April 29, 2012, aged 54, at his home in Hidden Hills, California. His interment was at Forest Lawn - Hollywood Hills Cemetery.

Emmy Award nominations
Outstanding Music Composition for a Series (Dramatic Underscore) – Stargate SG-1 (1998)
Outstanding Main Title Theme Music – Stargate Atlantis (2005)
Outstanding Music Composition for a Series (Original Dramatic Score) – Stargate Atlantis (2006)

Credits

References

External links
FreeClyde – The Official Website of Joel Goldsmith

Joel Goldsmith Memorial on Destinies-The Voice of Science Fiction

1957 births
2012 deaths
20th-century American Jews
21st-century American Jews
American film score composers
American male film score composers
American people of Romanian-Jewish descent
American television composers
Burials at Forest Lawn Memorial Park (Hollywood Hills)
Deaths from cancer in California
Jewish American film score composers
Jewish American television composers
Male television composers
Musicians from Los Angeles
Video game composers